Two-time defending champion Martina Navratilova defeated Chris Evert Lloyd in the final, 7–6(7–5), 6–2 to win the ladies' singles tennis title at the 1984 Wimbledon Championships. It was her fifth Wimbledon singles title and tenth major singles title overall.

Seeds

  Martina Navratilova (champion)
  Chris Evert Lloyd (final)
  Hana Mandlíková (semifinals)
  Pam Shriver (quarterfinals)
  Zina Garrison (second round)
  Kathy Jordan (semifinals)
  Manuela Maleeva (quarterfinals)
  Kathy Horvath (second round)
  Wendy Turnbull (fourth round)
  Jo Durie (quarterfinals)
  Lisa Bonder (third round)
  Claudia Kohde-Kilsch (fourth round)
  Barbara Potter (fourth round)
  Helena Suková (fourth round)
  Andrea Temesvári (fourth round)
  Carling Bassett (third round)

Qualifying

Draw

Finals

Top half

Section 1

Section 2

Section 3

Section 4

Bottom half

Section 5

Section 6

Section 7

Section 8

See also
 Evert–Navratilova rivalry

References

External links

1984 Wimbledon Championships – Women's draws and results at the International Tennis Federation

Women's Singles
Wimbledon Championship by year – Women's singles
Wimbledon Championships
Wimbledon Championships